The Crystal Film is a film award recognising domestic box office achievements in the Netherlands. The Crystal Film is awarded to documentary films from the Netherlands once they have sold 10,000 tickets.

The award is an initiative of the Netherlands Film Festival and the Netherlands Film Fund to increase media attention for Dutch documentary films, in addition to the existing Golden Film and Platinum Film for Dutch films in general. They announced the introduction of the Crystal Film on 28 April 2005. The first Crystal Film was awarded on 21 June 2005 to Shape of the Moon (2004). Since its introduction, the Crystal Film has been awarded to twelve films.

Films that received the Crystal Film

Notes

References

External links
Kristallen Film
Golden and Platin Film Netherlands at the Internet Movie Database

Dutch film awards
Film box office